Packera is a genus of about 64 species of plants in the daisy family, Asteraceae. Most species are commonly called ragworts or grounsels. Its members were previously included in the genus Senecio (where they were called aureoid senecios by Asa Gray), but were divided out based on chromosome numbers, a variety of morphological characters, and molecular phylogeny.

Species
 Packera anonyma (Wood) W.A. Weber & A. Löve − Small's ragwort	 
 Packera antennariifolia (Britt.) W.A. Weber & A. Löve − shalebarren ragwort	 
 Packera aurea (L.) A.& D. Löve − golden ragwort
 Senecio aureus L.
 Packera bernardina (Greene) W.A. Weber & A. Löve − San Bernardino ragwort	 
 Packera bolanderi (Gray) W.A. Weber & A. Löve − Bolander's ragwort	 
 Packera breweri (Burtt-Davy) W.A. Weber & A. Löve − Brewer's ragwort	
 Senecio breweri Burtt-Davy
 Packera cana (Hook.) W.A. Weber & A. Löve − woolly groundsel	 
 Packera cardamine (Greene) W.A. Weber & A. Löve − bittercress ragwort	 
 Packera castoreus (Welsh) Kartesz, comb. nov. ined. − Beaver Mountain ragwort	 
 Packera clevelandii (Greene) W.A. Weber & A. Löve − Cleveland's ragwort
 Senecio clevelandii Greene	 
 Packera contermina (Greenm.) T.M. Barkl., comb. nov. ined. 	 
 Packera crocata (Rydb.) W.A. Weber & A. Löve − saffron ragwort	 
 Packera cymbalaria (Pursh) W.A. Weber & A. Löve − dwarf arctic ragwort	 
 Packera cymbalarioides (Buek) W.A. Weber & A. Löve − cleftleaf groundsel	 
 Packera cynthioides (Greene) W.A. Weber & A. Löve − White Mountain ragwort
 Senecio cynthiodes Greene 
 Packera debilis (Nutt.) W.A. Weber & A. Löve − weak groundsel	 
 Packera dimorphophylla (Greene) W.A. Weber & A. Löve − splitleaf groundsel	 
 Packera eurycephala (Torr. & Gray ex Gray) W.A. Weber & A. Löve − widehead groundsel	 
 Packera fendleri (Gray) W.A. Weber & A. Löve − Fendler's ragwort	 
 Packera flettii (Wieg.) W.A. Weber & A. Löve − Flett's ragwort	 
 Packera franciscana (Greene) W.A. Weber & A. Löve − San Francisco Peaks ragwort	 
 Senecio franciscanus Greene − San Francisco Peaks groundsel
 Packera ganderi (T.M. Barkl. & Beauchamp) W.A. Weber & A. Löve − Gander's ragwort	 
 Packera glabella (Poir) C. Jeffrey − butterweed
 Senecio glabellus Poir.	 
 Packera greenei (Gray) W.A. Weber & A. Löve − flame ragwort	 
 Packera hartiana (Heller) W.A. Weber & A. Löve − Hart's ragwort	 
 Packera hesperia (Greene) W.A. Weber & A. Löve − western ragwort	 
 Packera hyperborealis (Greenm.) A.& D. Löve − northern groundsel	 
 Packera indecora (Greene) A.& D. Löve − elegant groundsel	 
Packera insulae-regalis R.R. Kowal − Isle Royale ragwort	 
 Packera ionophylla (Greene) W.A. Weber & A. Löve − Tehachapi ragwort	 
 Packera layneae (Greene) W.A. Weber & A. Löve − Layne's ragwort	 
 Packera macounii (Greene) W.A. Weber & A. Löve − Siskiyou Mountain ragwort	 
 Packera malmstenii (Blake ex Tidestrom) Kartesz, comb. nov. ined. − Podunk ragwort	 
 Packera millefolia (Torr. & Gray) T.M. Barkl., comb. nov. ined. − piedmont ragwort
 Packera millefolium  (Torr. & A. Gray) W.A. Weber & A. Löve
 Senecio millefolium Torr. & Gray 
 Packera millelobata (Rydb.) W.A. Weber & A. Löve − Uinta ragwort
 Packera moresbiensis (Calder & Roy L. Taylor) J.F. Bain – Cleftleaf ragwort
 Packera multilobata (Torr. & Gray ex Gray) W.A. Weber & A. Löve − lobeleaf groundsel
 Senecio multilobatus Torr. & Gray ex Gray
 Packera musiniensis (S. L. Welsh) Trock
 Packera neomexicana (Gray) W.A. Weber & A. Löve − New Mexico groundsel	 
 Packera obovata (Muhl. ex Willd.) W.A. Weber & A. Löve − roundleaf ragwort
 Senecio obovatus Muhl. ex Willd.
 Packera ogotorukensis (Packer) A.& D. Löve − Ogotoruk Creek ragwort	 
 Packera pauciflora (Pursh) A.& D. Löve − alpine groundsel	 
 Packera paupercula (Michx.) A.& D. Löve − balsam groundsel	 
 Packera plattensis (Nutt.) W.A. Weber & A. Löve − prairie groundsel
 Senecio plattensis Nutt. 
 Packera porteri (Greene) C. Jeffrey − Porter's groundsel	 
 Packera pseudaurea (Rydb.) W.A. Weber & A. Löve − falsegold groundsel	 
 Packera quaerens (Greene) W.A. Weber & A. Löve − Mogollon Mountain ragwort
 Senecio quaerens Greene 
 Packera quercetorum (Greene) C. Jeffrey − Oak Creek ragwort	 
 Packera sanguisorboides (Rydb.) W.A. Weber & A. Löve − burnet ragwort	 
 Packera schweinitziana (Nutt.) W.A. Weber & A. Löve − Schweinitz's ragwort
 Senecio schweinitzianus Nutt. 
 Packera serpenticola Boufford, Kartesz, S.H. Shi & Renchao Zhou − serpentine ragwort 
 Packera spellenbergii (T.M. Barkl.) C. Jeffrey − Carrizo Creek ragwort	 
 Packera streptanthifolia (Greene) W.A. Weber & A. Löve − Rocky Mountain groundsel 
 Packera subnuda (DC.) D.K. Trock & T.M. Barkley – Buek's groundsel	 
 Packera tampicana (DC.) C. Jeffrey − Great Plains ragwort	 
 Packera tomentosa (Michx.) C. Jeffrey − woolly ragwort	 
 Packera tridenticulata (Rydb.) W.A. Weber & A. Löve − threetooth ragwort	 
 Packera werneriifolia (Gray) W.A. Weber & A. Löve − hoary groundsel
Sources: NRCS

References

 
Asteraceae genera